The 1968 VFL Grand Final was an Australian rules football game contested between the Carlton Football Club and Essendon Football Club, held at the Melbourne Cricket Ground on Saturday, 28 September 1968. It was the 71st annual Grand Final of the Victorian Football League, staged to determine the premiers for the 1968 VFL season. The match, attended by a record crowd of 116,828 spectators, was won by Carlton ("The Blues") by a margin of 3 points, making it that club's ninth premiership victory, but its first since winning the 1947 VFL Grand Final.

The Blues emerged victorious despite Essendon kicking more goals, the only time that happened in a VFL Grand Final. There was a strong wind blowing during the whole game, which did not help it as a spectacle and possibly contributed to Carlton's inaccuracy. Garry Crane starred on the wing for the Blues with 30 possessions.

Essendon came within a point of Carlton at the 20 minute mark of the final term after a goal to Geoff Blethyn. Despite being goal-less in the final quarter, Carlton managed to keep their lead, thanks largely to 20th man Neil Chandler, who took some crucial marks in the dying stages.

Aided by the opening during the year of the ground's new Western Stand, the attendance of 116,828 was the highest at a VFL premiership decider up to that time, breaking the record of 115,902 spectators who witnessed the 1956 VFL Grand Final. The new record was broken at the 1969 VFL Grand Final, and that record was broken in turn at the 1970 VFL Grand Final.

Teams

Scorecard

Footnotes

References
 Ross, J. (ed), 100 Years of Australian Football 1897–1996: The Complete Story of the AFL, All the Big Stories, All the Great Pictures, All the Champions, Every AFL Season Reported, Viking, (Ringwood), 1996.

External links
 

VFL/AFL Grand Finals
Grand
Carlton Football Club
Essendon Football Club